Euura mucronata is a species of sawfly belonging to the family Tenthredinidae (common sawflies). The larva feed within galls on the buds of willows (Salix species). It was first described by Theodor Hartig in 1837.

Description
The bud of the host species is about twice the normal size and pear-shape. The greenish larva feeds within the gall which also contains frass and the bud falls to the ground in the autumn where the larva pupates. Several buds on the same shoot can be galled and the insect has a single generation per year (i.e. univoltine). Most species of Euura are monophagous on Salix species but there is some discussion on whether Euura mucronata is a group of closely related species, each feeding on different Salix species, or whether it is polyphagous feeding on over thirty species of willow.

Distribution
Euura mucronata is found in Europe from Ireland, east to the Ukraine and from Norway, south to Portugal.

References

Tenthredinidae
Gall-inducing insects
Hymenoptera of Europe
Insects described in 1837
Taxa named by Theodor Hartig
Willow galls